Kočišta is an abandoned village in the municipality of Centar Župa, North Macedonia.

Demographics
The village when inhabited in past times had a Muslim Macedonian speaking (Torbeš) population.

According to the 2002 census, the village had a total of 0 inhabitants.

References

Villages in Centar Župa Municipality
Macedonian Muslim villages